The University of AlKafeel (formerly the College of Humanitarian Studies and the Alkafeel University College) is an  Iraqi university located in Najaf, Iraq  established in 2003, and owned by AL-Abbasiya holy shrine.

Brief summary
University of Al-Kafeel was established on 1-10-2003, by the charity of Najaf.                                           
The university was recognized by the ministry of higher education and scientific research. According to this order, the University of AL-Kafeel gives the bachelor's degree, based on the regulations of the ministry of Higher Education and scientific research in Iraq. Alumni of the university are eligible to continue their postgraduate study inside and outside Iraq. During 2017, 7482 students joined the university, and 3736 students got graduated.

Faculties
The university of AL-Kafeel consists of the following colleges and departments:
 College of Dentistry
 College of Pharmacy
 College of Laboratories and Medical Techniques
 College of Technical Engineering
 College of Law
 Department of Media
 Department of Shariaa
 Department of Religious Tourism

Kufa
Kufa
Alkafeel
2003 establishments in Iraq